The Minardi M197 was the car with which the Minardi Formula One team competed in the 1997 Formula One season.

Development
In late 1996, Minardi were acquired by a consortium led by Flavio Briatore including former Minardi driver Alessandro Nannini and Gabriele Rumi of Fondmetal.  Giancarlo Minardi retained a minority shareholding of the team that bore his name.

The M197 was developed by Minardi chief engineer Gabriele Tredozi, head of the drawing office Mauro Gennaro, and lead aerodynamicist Mariano Alperin.  The M197 was developed heavily at Fondmetal's wind tunnel in Ferrara, Italy. Davide Colombo also joined the aerodynamics team from F3000.  Although design and development work had begun in mid-1996, the decision to use Hart V8 engines for 1997 was made late leading to extensive redesign work on the car in preparation for the first Grand Prix.

Racing overview
Minardi launched the M197 on February 4, 1997. It was confirmed at the unveiling the 1997 drivers would be Ukyo Katayama and rookie Jarno Trulli. Tarso Marques was retained as a test driver At the launch, it was announced a partnership with Mild Seven.

At the first Grand Prix in Australia, both drivers qualified well - ahead of both Tyrrell's, both Arrows including that of reigning World Champion Damon Hill and both Lola's. Katayama would ultimately retire from the race, however Trulli finished in 9th. Trulli would go on to complete all of the first three Grand Prix, whilst more experienced team mate Katayama suffered two retirements.  Trulli failed to start the San Marino Grand Prix due to a hydraulic failure. 

Ahead of the 1997 French Grand Prix, Trulli left Minardi to join Prost Grand Prix and was replaced by Marques.  Neither Marques or Katayama would score a point during the remainder of the season. Marques was disqualified from the 1997 Austrian Grand Prix due to a weight infringement.

The team were unclassified in the Constructors' Championship, with no points.  They were classified ahead of the Lola team, who withdrew from the championship after the first Grand Prix.

Test drivers
The M197 was utilised by a number of drivers during test sessions.  Alongside the three race drivers of Katayama, Trulli and Marques the M197 was tested by Esteban Tuero, Tom Kristensen, Luca Badoer, Laurent Redon and Oliver Martini.

Livery 
The M197 featured a return to Minardi's colour scheme of black, yellow and white, used from 1988 to 1992. Fondmetal was one of the major sponsors, along with Mild Seven (brought by new driver Ukyo Katayama) and Roces.

Complete Formula One results
(key) (results in bold indicate pole position)

References

AUTOCOURSE 1997-98, Henry, Alan (ed.), Hazleton Publishing Ltd. (1997) 

Minardi Formula One cars
1997 Formula One season cars